Just Ask, Inc. is a Canadian children's science television series which aired on CBC Television in 1981.

Premise
David Suzuki hosted this science series geared towards children between ages eight and twelve. Topics included anatomy, astronomy, nature, snoring and the twinkling of stars. Neil McInnes provided animated segments.

Scheduling
This half-hour series was broadcast Wednesdays at 4:00 p.m. (Eastern) from 4 February to 25 March 1981, then another series run Mondays at 4:00 p.m. from 19 October to 28 December 1981. His co-host was a robot, Lustra (Joan Stuart voice) in the first season and Ami (Luba Goy voice) in the second series run.

References

External links
 
 

CBC Television original programming
1981 Canadian television series debuts
1981 Canadian television series endings
1980s Canadian children's television series
Canadian television series with live action and animation